Trinity High School  is a private, coeducational Roman Catholic high school of the Roman Catholic Diocese of Harrisburg, located in Camp Hill, Pennsylvania, west of Harrisburg. The school has 55 faculty members and an enrollment of about 525 students in grades 9 through 12. The school was twice listed (1992, 1999) as a Blue Ribbon School by the U.S. Department of Education. The school's mascot is the Shamrock.

Athletics
Trinity is a part of the PIAA District III and the Mid Penn Conference. It has been known for its athletics for many years. The boys and girls basketball teams have claimed multiple PIAA State Championships as well as several District Championships. The boys Track and Field teams won two straight PIAA State Championships in 2010 and 2011. The girls soccer team was the runner up in the 2010 and 2013 PIAA State tournaments before winning their first title in 2014 and repeating as state champions in 2015 and 2016. Athletes from Trinity High School also won PIAA state gold in boys cross country (2010) and girls diving (2011).

Controversy
In 2011, Trinity was the subject of a police investigation after an open lewdness incident was reported at the football team's training camp. A number of Trinity students who were identified as the perpetrators of the event were subsequently prosecuted. The school also disciplined students, which included expulsion for some.

The Trinity football program came under media and police scrutiny for off-season misconduct in 2016 when two team members were captured on video assaulting a man while attending a Donald Trump rally at neighboring Cumberland Valley High School. These students faced consequences from the school, including cleaning it.

Sports Championships

Notable alumni
Greg Brown - sportscaster, Pittsburgh Pirates play-by-play announcer.
William J. Burns - American diplomat; current Director of the CIA.
Chris Crane - free agent NFL quarterback; played for Boston College
Shane Gillis - stand-up comedian, radio personality, and podcaster.
Matt Kranchick - free agent NFL tight end; attended Penn State.
James Urban - Class of 1992, wide receivers coach for the Cincinnati Bengals.
 Brian Osborne - contestant on 10th season of The Bachelorette

References

External links
 

Camp Hill, Pennsylvania
Roman Catholic Diocese of Harrisburg
Educational institutions established in 1963
Catholic secondary schools in Pennsylvania
High schools in Central Pennsylvania
Schools in Cumberland County, Pennsylvania
1963 establishments in Pennsylvania